Joel Chadabe (December 12, 1938 – May 2, 2021) was an American composer, author, and internationally recognized pioneer in the development of interactive music systems. He earned a BA from the University of North Carolina at Chapel Hill, then earned his MM at Yale while studying under Elliott Carter. His students include Liz Phillips, Richard Lainhart, and David A. Jaffe. He designed the CEMS, built by Robert Moog, in 1967. He was the president of Intelligent Music, "one of the several companies that distribute software and hardware for interactive composing," from 1983 to 1994. The Electronic Music Foundation was founded in 1994 by Chadabe. Chadabe was the curator at New York sound gallery Engine 27 in 2000–01. Chadabe was given the SEAMUS Lifetime Achievement Award in 2007.
In a 2013 interview with Peter Shea, Chadabe discussed a variety of topics, ranging from the history of electronic music to his own work processes.

Early life 
Chadabe was born December 12, 1938 in Bronx, NY, the son of Solon Chadabe, a lawyer, and Sylvia (née Cohen) Chadabe, a homemaker. Joel attended grade school at the Bentley School  and then University of North Carolina at Chapel Hill. He studied music in college and graduated in 1959, despite his parents hoping that he would become a lawyer. Chadabe then continued his education at Yale University, studying with the composer Elliott Carter and completing a Master's degree in music (M.M.) in 1962.

Computer music and career 
Upon completing his education at Yale, Chadabe and Carter traveled to Italy, where Chadabe continued his studies. Chadabe was interested in jazz and opera, but was offered a job opportunity at the State University of New York at Albany (SUNY Albany) to direct its electronic music studio.

Bibliography 
Chadabe, Joel (1997). Electric Sound: The Past and Promise of Electronic Music. .
Chadabe, Joel (1975). "The Voltage-controlled Synthesizer", The Development and Practice of Electronic Music (Jon H. Appleton and Ronald Perera, eds.). .

Discography
After Some Songs (1995). Deep Listening CD 001.

References

External links
Chadabe, Joel (April 22, 2007). "About Ear to the Earth", EartotheEarth.org.
Chadabe, Joel (April 1, 2001 12:00 PM). "The Electronic Century Part III: Computers and Analog Synthesizers", EMusician.com.

American male composers
21st-century American composers
American electronic musicians
1938 births
2021 deaths
University of North Carolina at Chapel Hill alumni
Yale School of Music alumni
21st-century American male musicians